City is a 2001 album by Jane Siberry.

It is a collection of songs which mostly had not previously appeared on a regular Siberry album, comprising tracks that she recorded for movie soundtracks or in collaboration with other artists.

Track listing

"My Mother is Not the White Dove" (with Peter Gabriel) 	 
"Harmonix/I Went Down to the River" (with Peter Gabriel) 
"It Can't Rain All the Time" (from The Crow)
"Shir Amami" (with Frank London)
"The Bridge" (with Joe Jackson)
"She's Like a Swallow" (with Hector Zazou)
"When I Think of Laura Nyro" (from Time and Love: The Music of Laura Nyro)
"Calling All Angels" (with k.d. lang) 
"Nut Brown Maid" (with Michael Grey)
"All the Pretty Ponies" (from Barney & Friends) 
"Innig" (with Nigel Kennedy)
"Spade and Sparrow" (with Takafumi Sotoma) 
"Narrow Bridge" (with Morgan Fisher)	 
"Slow Tango" (from Faraway, So Close!)
"The Kiss" (with Ghostland)

Jane Siberry albums
2001 compilation albums